Armistead Burwell (October 22, 1839 – May 13, 1913) was a teacher, Confederate soldier, lawyer, state senator, and associate justice of the North Carolina Supreme Court.

Life
Burwell was born on October 22, 1839, in Hillsborough, North Carolina.  His parents were Rev. Robert Burwell, the Presbyterian pastor there and Margaret Anna (Robertson) Burwell. His parents moved to Charlotte in 1857 and founded the Charlotte Female Institute that year, which is now Queens University of Charlotte.

After graduating from Davidson College in 1859 he taught school. Teaching in Princeton, Arkansas at the start of the Civil War, he served as adjutant in Company A of the 3rd Arkansas Cavalry, reached the rank of Captain. His unit saw action in Missouri, Arkansas, Tennessee, Mississippi, and Georgia where he was severely wounded on July 28, 1864, while his unit was defending Atlanta. He became the assistant adjutant general to Brigadier General F.C. Armstrong.

At war's end, Burwell returned to North Carolina and resumed teaching school in Charlotte. He also studied law and became licensed to practice in 1869.

He entered law partnerships with Calvin E. Grier and then Zebulon Baird Vance, a former Confederate officer and North Carolina governor during the Confederacy, and future United States senator, in a firm named Vance & Burwell. In 1877, he was appointed as a director of the state-owned North Carolina Railroad.

From 1880 to 1900, Burwell was in a law partnership with Platt D. Walker, who also became an Associate Justice (1903–1923) but served after Burwell left the court. This firm was initially Burwell & Walker, then Burwell, Walker & Cansler.

Later in 1880, Burwell was elected from the 29th Senate District to represent Mecklenburg County in the North Carolina Senate of the 84th General Assembly that met in 1881. He also served as city attorney and county attorney, and dean of the Charlotte bar association.

Two days after the November 14, 1892, death of North Carolina Supreme Court Chief Justice Augustus Merrimon, the court elected James E. Shepherd to be the new Chief Justice and Governor Thomas Holt appointed Burwell to fill Shepard's associate justice seat for the remaining three years of an eight-year term. In the General Election of 1894, Burwell failed to win reelection and left the court on January 1, 1895, returning to his private law practice in Charlotte. Since 1868, the state constitution called for the election of justices by the people.

Personal
Burwell married Ella Maude Jenkins in 1869; they had six known children, three dying in infancy. The others were daughters Ella Maude, Frances Armistead, and son Armistead Burwell, Jr. His wife predeceased him in 1907.

He died May 13, 1913, and was buried in the Elmwood Cemetery in Charlotte.

References

External links
 Confederate Military Service Records National Archives, 20 images.

1839 births
1913 deaths
People from Hillsborough, North Carolina
People of Arkansas in the American Civil War
People of North Carolina in the American Civil War
Justices of the North Carolina Supreme Court
Davidson College alumni
North Carolina state senators
19th-century American politicians
Confederate States Army officers
19th-century American judges
Burwell family of Virginia